The Latin American Council of Churches (Consejo Latinoamericano de Iglesias) is a regional ecumenical body with 139 member churches and organizations in 19 countries, representing some two million Christians. The head office of the organization is in Quito, Ecuador. It was founded in 1982.

Members 

 Andean region 
 National Council of Christian Churches in Brazil
 Caribbean Conference of Churches
 Mesoamerica Region
 Rio de la Plata region

External links 
 
World Council of Churches listing

Sources 

Regional councils of churches
International organisations based in Ecuador
Christian organizations established in 1982
 
International Christian organizations
1982 establishments in Ecuador